Merovo is a village in the municipality of Želino, North Macedonia.

Demographics
As of the 2021 census, Merovo had 544 residents with the following ethnic composition:
Albanians 515
Persons for whom data are taken from administrative sources 29

According to the 2002 census, the village had a total of 901 inhabitants. Ethnic groups in the village include:
Albanians 882
Macedonians 1
Others 18

References

External links

Villages in Želino Municipality
Albanian communities in North Macedonia